Simcoach Games is an American computer-simulated training company with offices in Pittsburgh, in Pennsylvania. It was started in 2005 under the name Etcetera Edutainment by Jessica Trybus, who at that time was director of educational entertainment at the Entertainment Technology Center of Carnegie Mellon University in Pittsburgh, and at first made simulators for training in the manufacturing and health industries. The company changed its name to Simcoach Games in 2014.

References 

Video game companies of the United States
Mobile game companies
Video game companies established in 2005
Companies based in Pittsburgh